Evgeny Zarafiants (born 1959 in Novosibirsk, Russian SFSR) is a pianist.  He studied at the Glinka Conservatory in Gorky.  Zarafiants later taught at the Conservatory in Nizhny Novgorod.  His recordings include the Preludes of Alexander Scriabin and the keyboard sonatas of Domenico Scarlatti. In 1993, he was awarded joint-second prize at the Ivo Pogorelich International Solo Piano Competition at the Ambassador Auditorium in Pasadena, California.

Discography 
 Art & Music: Klimt - Music of His Time. Naxos
 Scarlatti: Keyboard Sonatas, Vol. 6. Naxos
 Scriabin: Preludes, Vol 1. Naxos	
 Scriabin: Preludes, Vol. 2. Naxos
 Rachmaninov Piano Sonata No. 1, etc.. ALM Records
 Rachmaninov Piano Sonata No. 2, and preludes by Rachmaninov and Bach. ALM Records
 Beethoven: Piano Sonata No.14, 26 . Esoteric
 Chopin: Ballade No.1, Scherzo No.1, 2. Esoteric

References

Further reading

1959 births
Living people
Russian classical pianists
Male classical pianists
Academic staff of Novosibirsk Conservatory
Russian people of Armenian descent
21st-century classical pianists
21st-century Russian male musicians